Lego Speed Champions is an auto racing-inspired theme of Lego building sets first released in 2015. 
It features classic and modern styles from well-known car brands.

Overview
The Lego Speed Champions product line focuses on classic and modern styles from well-known car brands. The series featured Ferrari, McLaren, and Porsche models in its initial release. Each sets was designed by Lego Design Manager Chris Stamp. The theme later added Audi, Bugatti, Chevrolet, Dodge, Ford, Jaguar, Lamborghini, Koenigsegg, Nissan, Toyota, Aston Martin, and Lotus. The line features as the center of a 2019 expansion for the open world racing video game Forza Horizon 4. 

In 2022, The Lego Group stated that the theme is an 18+ (18 years and older) theme that does not carry the 18+ label.

In April 2022, The Lego Group built a life-size replica of the 1970 Ferrari 512 M contained 78,496 of Lego pieces. The Lego Group also built a life-size replica of the Ferrari F40 contained 358,000 of Lego pieces and placed in front of the Legoland California.

Development
During the development process of the Lego Speed Champions theme, Lego Design Manager Chris Stamp discussed the concept of the Lego Speed Champions theme and explained, "Absolutely. The enlarged scale has allowed us to develop a new strategy, which essentially is to forget the age on the box! We want to offer unique building experiences that educate younger builders and are appreciated by older builders simultaneously. That is how we approach each model because there is no age limit on being a car enthusiast, so we can cover older and modern subjects. We focus exclusively on vehicle fans, of any age." and continued, "Also, the small size of Speed Champions cars does not mean they must be easy to build. We have seen the range described as ‘mini Creator Expert’ and that is honestly how we approach every set. We include as much detail as possible and always target the utmost accuracy, hopefully giving people a Creator Expert or 18+ experience, at a much lower price point than those themes. Something I have observed is the different fan expectation and reception for larger models, like Modular Buildings or UCS sets, relative to smaller models. My goal is always narrowing the gap between those sets of different scales and conveying the same experience as much larger sets, at a tenth of the size."

Chris Stamp discussed a 1x2 tile without printing and explained, "We tried that, but the headlights looked too narrow with red tiles and we always prioritise attention to detail. Also, when we are developing the elements, we do not always know the quality of the final print, so there is sometimes a disconnect between how we intend the product to be and the production capability." and continued, "Actually, there was a slight change to the cockpit printing between 2020 and 2021, where small gaps appeared along the creases of the elements. Production introduced those gaps because of the need to guarantee a certain level of quality. I have not spotted any discussion about that online, but it is something we are examining internally."

Chris Stamp discussed about the introduction of movie-inspired cars and explained, "Looking back through the development and direction of Speed Champions, we have already expanded to include vehicles other than supercars, including the John Cooper Works buggy, Lamborghini Urus and the Ford Bronco Dakar racer. Fundamentally, the theme’s identity is collectable, IP-driven, eight-stud-side vehicles which are all in scale when displayed together. There are really no limits on what we can do, as long as they satisfy those flexible parameters." and continued, "On a personal level, I am a huge movie fan, so I have been moving towards creating these vehicles for the last three years. Also, not everyone who likes cars is interested in racing, so introducing some recognisable film vehicles felt completely natural to me. Broadening the appeal of the theme, without losing what we have already built, is never a bad thing."

Launch
The Lego Speed Champions theme was launched on 1 March 2015. The Lego Group announced a partnership with Ferrari, McLaren Mercedes and Porsche. As part of the marketing campaign, The Lego Group released the six sets based on racing cars. Each set featured different racing cars such as Ferrari, McLaren Mercedes and Porsche. The sets were designed primarily for children 7 to 14 years old.

Construction sets
In 2015, The Lego Group released seven iconic sets in the new Speed Champions line: the LaFerrari, McLaren P1, Porsche 918 Spyder, Ferrari 458 Italia GT2, F14 T & Scuderia Ferrari Truck, Porsche 911 GT Finish Line, and the McLaren Mercedes Pit Stop. Seven sets - nine vehicles including the Ferrari transport truck and the two Porsche 911 GTs in the Finish Line set.

In 2016, the theme it was all about muscle cars, with the Ford Mustang, Chevrolet Corvette, and Chevy Camaro. It also included a Ford Model A Hotrod and F-150 Raptor, as well as LMP race cars from Audi and Porsche.

In 2017, Lego Speed Champions theme returned to Formula 1 cars from Ferrari and the championship-winning Mercedes AMG Petronas team.

In 2018, the theme featured more Ferrari and Porsche Race cars, including the Nurburgring Lap Record holding car, the Porsche 919 Hybrid. The line also included a 1967 Ford Mustang. However no new brands were added. 

For 2019 the theme returned, with a new focus on including new brands into the collection: Dodge and Mini.

In late 2019, Design Lead Chris Stamp announced that all 2020+ Speed Champions sets would be upscaled to 8 studs wide from the previous standard of 6, to focus on accuracy. Chris Stamp explained, "I have been on Speed Champions since the beginning, I developed the concept in 2014 for the 2015 launch, did four of the seven products for that launch, I was the only designer for the 2016 launch, then developed a lot of the concept models for the third launch when I went off to work on NINJAGO and then The LEGO NINJAGO Movie." and continued, "Then I came back for this launch, as the Design Lead for 2019, so I was able to map out what the assortment was. There were a few cars that we knew straight away we wanted, we knew we wanted the Mini because we had been in dialogue with Mini for a while, the McLaren we wanted because I had seen the Senna right back when it was a clay model three years ago. Coming back to the Speed Champions theme it was really quite a rushed process, we didn’t really have time to start all of this exploration." 

The 2020 sets include a Lamborghini Huracan Super Trofeo and Nissan GTR Nismo as well as introduced electric vehicles with Formula E and Jaguar. Prices also increased with the shift in scale.

In January 2020 a polybag set was released of the Lamborghini Huracan Super Trofeo. 2 more sets followed in early 2021, McLaren Elva and Aston Martin Valkyrie AMR Pro.

In June 2021, 6 Lego Speed Champions sets were delayed until Summer, causing speculation amongst fans that the theme had been cancelled. Featuring in the range is a 1970 Dodge Charger T/A, Top Fuel Dragster, Toyota Supra, Corvette C8.R and Koenigsegg Jesko.

In March 2022, 5 new sets of Ferrari 512 M, Lotus Evija, Lamborghini Countach, Mercedes-AMG F1 W12 E Performance, Mercedes-AMG Project One, Aston Martin Valkyrie AMR Pro and Aston Martin Vantage GT3 expanded the collection.

In June 2022, 2 new sets of James Bond's Aston Martin DB5 based on James Bond franchise and Dominic Toretto’s 1970 Dodge Charger R/T based on Fast & Furious franchise were be released on 1 August 2022. James Bond's Aston Martin DB5 set consists of 298 pieces and 1 minifigure of James Bond. Also included multiple license plates to swap. Aston Martin DB5 set doesn't include gadgets. Dominic Toretto's 1970 Dodge Charger R/T set consists of 345 pieces and 1 minifigure of Dominic Toretto. Chris Stamp commented on the 'Iconic Movie and TV Vehicles' a new sub-theme by stating, "To be honest, it’s just an extension of the overall LEGO Speed Champions theme and by that I mean an 8-module wide IP vehicle collection. I don’t want to exclude any vehicles. Although, I tend to think it is essentially a vehicle collection - but that’s not all it could be! If the fans like these iconic movie and TV vehicles and the sets are well received, then we will probably add more to the collection."

In January 2023, one new set named Brian O'Conner's 2 Fast 2 Furious Nissan Skyline GTR (R34) based on the 2 Fast 2 Furious film.  The set consists of 319 pieces and 1 minifigure of Brian O'Conner. Chris Stamp commented on the 2 Fast 2 Furious Nissan Skyline GTR (R34) set by stating, “I want to stress that the movie and television Speed Champions series is not becoming the Fast & Furious series! We want to choose the most iconic subjects and there probably could be three or four from Fast and Furious, but it was just incidental that two of our first three movie cars are from the same franchise. Universal was brilliant to work with and it is also the 20th anniversary of 2 Fast 2 Furious in 2023, so the Nissan Skyline was the perfect choice.” Chris Stamp also announced Speed Champions sets would included printed seats and explained, “We’re including decorated seats like we did on the [76902 McLaren Elva], because the racing seat is quite iconic to this car.” and continued, “When you see Brian in the car it’s not just the exterior that’s all blue and grey, but it’s also the interior, so we’ve tried to capture that as well.”

In January 2023, four new sets named Ferrari 812 Competizione, Pagani Utopia, Porsche 963 and McLaren Solus GT & McLaren F1 LM were announced to be released on 1 March 2023. Chris Stamp discussed about a Plate Special 1 x 1 x ⅔ Half Circle with Stud on Side and explained, “This is an element that was on our bucket list for a couple of years now,” and continued, “We don’t actually have anything like this, unless you put an Erling [1×1 headlight brick] sideways on its back. This new brick allows you to get a stud on the side at two plates high in a 1×1 module space." Chris Stamp discussed about Chassis 6x12x1 1/3 and Mudguard 2x4x2 and explained, "These two elements combined allow us to make the cars even lower down and closer to the wheels like you can see with the Pagani. I think this is a real game changer for LEGO Speed Champions. I'm really excited about what people think and how they react to that."

Before the released of the McLaren Solus GT and McLaren F1 LM double pack, The Lego Group celebrated 60 years of McLaren Automotive and engineer Bruce McLaren founded McLaren. McLaren chief designer Goran Ozbolt stated, “As 2023 marks the 60th anniversary of McLaren and our founder’s passion to create the ultimate supercars, we felt this was the perfect opportunity to come together with the LEGO Group and celebrate some of the iconic McLaren road cars whose designs were born of that vision,” and continued, "Together with LEGO Speed Champions, we have created our first ever McLaren double pack which features the iconic McLaren F1 LM and our latest track focussed hypercar, the Solus GT of which only 25 will be sold to customers and which was originally created as a video game concept car. Whatever age you are, you can have fun building and exploring the cars and through that I hope we can inspire future designers and engineers who will help us look to the next 60 years and beyond.” Chris Stamp stated, "We aim to inspire LEGO vehicle fans of all ages with new and unique building experiences, every time we expand the Speed Champions Collection. This launch is another great example of this long-standing partnership.”

Visual Database

Video game
It was announced at E3 2019 that The Lego Group and Playground Games had partnered together to add a new expansion pack to Forza Horizon 4 featuring several cars from the line and a new location made out of Lego bricks. The expansion pack was released on June 13, 2019.

Reception 
In 2020, The Lego Group reported that the Lego Technic, Lego Star Wars, Lego Classic, Lego Disney Princess, Lego Harry Potter and Lego Speed Champions, "The strong results are due to our incredible team," and that these themes had helped to push revenue for the first half of 2020 grow 7% to DKK 15.7 billion compared with the same period in 2019.

See also 
 Lego City
 Lego Fusion
 Lego Speed Racer
 Lego World Racers
 Lego Racers
 Lego Cars

References

External links
 
 

Speed Champions
Products introduced in 2015